Richard Hely-Hutchinson  may refer to:

Richard Hely-Hutchinson, 1st Earl of Donoughmore (1756–1825), Irish peer and politician
Richard Hely-Hutchinson, 4th Earl of Donoughmore (1823–1866), Irish peer and Conservative politician
Richard Hely-Hutchinson, 6th Earl of Donoughmore (1875–1948), Irish peer and politician
Richard Hely-Hutchinson, 8th Earl of Donoughmore (born 1927), Irish peer

See also
Richard Hutchinson (disambiguation)